Cryptolechia ichnitis is a moth in the family Depressariidae. It was described by Edward Meyrick in 1918. It is found in French Guiana.

The wingspan is about 20 mm. The forewings are pale whitish-ochreous, the costa towards the base tinged with fuscous. There is a small blackish triangular basal spot and a small blackish mark beneath and beyond this. The stigmata is blackish, the plical obliquely beyond the first discal, the second discal larger, preceded by a small spot confluent with it. There is a blackish subcostal dot above the first discal stigma and there is some faint fuscous suffusion on the costa before and beyond the middle, and above the dorsum at two-fifths. There are two posterior parallel transverse series of undefined cloudy spots of faint fuscous
suffusion, strongly excurved on the upper two-thirds, as well as a marginal series of cloudy dark fuscous dots around the posterior part of the costa and termen. The hindwings are whitish.

References

Moths described in 1918
Cryptolechia (moth)
Taxa named by Edward Meyrick